Thomas Alvard can refer to:
 Thomas Alvard (1460-1504), Ipswich merchant
 Thomas Alvard (1493-1535), MP for Ipswich and son of Thomas Alvard above